Lenny Clarke (born September 16, 1953) is an American comedian and actor. He is known for his thick Boston accent and as the role of  Uncle Teddy on the series Rescue Me.

Early life 
Clarke was born in Cambridge, Massachusetts on September 16, 1953. In his early life, Lenny Clarke tried to campaign for mayor in Cambridge.

Career
He was the most famous "saloon comic" in Boston during the 1980s, the heyday of the Boston comedy scene. The DVD release When Standup Stood Out (2006) details Clarke's early career and affiliations with other famous Boston comics, such as Steven Wright and Denis Leary, his good friends. In 1980, Clarke wrote and starred in a local television show Lenny Clarke's Late Show featuring Wright and Leary, in collaboration with Boston comedy writer Martin Olson. Clarke and Olson were roommates, and their apartment, known by comedians as "The Barracks", was a notorious "crash pad" for comics visiting Boston, per the film.

Clarke starred in his own short-lived network sitcom Lenny (1990), and in such TV shows as Contest Searchlight, The Job, The John Larroquette Show and It's All Relative and movies like Monument Ave., Fever Pitch and Southie. From 2004 to 2011, Clarke appeared in the recurring role of Uncle Teddy on the FX comedy drama Rescue Me.

In 2006, Clarke and Leary appeared on television during a Red Sox telecast and, upon realizing that Red Sox 1st baseman Kevin Youkilis is Jewish, delivered a criticism of Mel Gibson's anti-semitic comments.

In 2007, Clarke played the role of Ron Abbot on the short lived Fox comedy series The Winner. On May 16, 2007, the show was cancelled after six episodes due to low ratings.

Clarke is also an occasional guest on the WEEI radio shows in Boston. It was on this show that he announced he would be a regular on the 2009 Fox Sitcom Brothers as the racist neighbor who is married to a black woman. He wound up appearing in three episodes before the series was cancelled. In the 2011-12 TV season, he landed a role as the main character's father on the NBC mid-season replacement sitcom Are You There, Chelsea?.

On the evening of January 19, 2010, Clarke appeared on stage at the victory speech of Republican Senator elect from Massachusetts, Scott Brown, who was elected to the U.S. Senate seat formerly held by Ted Kennedy.

He had appeared on ESPN's 30 for 30 - 4 Days in October alongside ESPN sports and pop culture columnist Bill Simmons as a narrator giving insight on the 2004 ALCS comeback by the Red Sox against the New York Yankees.

Filmography

Films

TV series

Producer/executive producer

Writer

References

External links

1953 births
American male film actors
American stand-up comedians
American male television actors
Living people
Male actors from Cambridge, Massachusetts
Comedians from Massachusetts